Christopher Bevins is an American voice actor, ADR director and scriptwriter who has worked on English language adaptations of Japanese anime shows for Funimation and Bang Zoom! Entertainment. He dubbed roles in anime including Yasuhiro Hagakure from the Danganronpa series, Kenji from Initial D, Mercutio from Romeo × Juliet, Joe from Prison School, Life Cool from Yurikuma Arashi, Japan from the Hetalia series, Hanta Sero/Cellophane from My Hero Academia, and Shishiwakamaru from Yu Yu Hakusho.

Personal life 
Bevins was engaged to voice actress Rachel Robinson on October 26, 2018. They married on October 5, 2019.

Filmography

Anime

Video games

References

External links
 
 
 
 Christopher Bevins at CrystalAcids English Voice Actor & Production Staff Database
 

Living people
American male video game actors
American male voice actors
American voice directors
Funimation
21st-century American male actors
Year of birth missing (living people)